Aetna Hose, Hook and Ladder Company, Fire Station No. 2 is a historic fire station located at Newark in New Castle County, Delaware.  It was built in 1922 and is a two-story ashlar structure with secondary wings on three sides. It features a gable roof with frame cupola.

The four engine bays facing Academy Street house a tiller ladder, two modern engines, and the company's restored 1926 Seagrave engine "Old Bessie" which is used for parades and other special events.

It was listed on the National Register of Historic Places in 1982.

See also
 Aetna Hose, Hook and Ladder Company Fire Station No. 1

References

External links
 Aetna, Hose, Hook and Ladder Company

Fire stations completed in 1922
Fire stations on the National Register of Historic Places in Delaware
Buildings and structures in Newark, Delaware
National Register of Historic Places in New Castle County, Delaware
1922 establishments in Delaware
Neoclassical architecture in Delaware